No Saints is the first full-length album by the Canadian straight edge hardcore punk band Liferuiner, released in 2007. This album was recorded in early 2006 by Antoine Lussier of Ion Dissonance.

Track listing

Personnel

Liferuiner
Jonny O'Callaghan - Vocals
Daniel Steinbok - Guitar/Bass
Jose Lopez - Session drums & additional vocals

Production
Jay Scarlino - Additional vocals
Antoine Lussier - Additional vocals
Produced & Engineered by Dan Weston @ Wild Studio in April 2006
Mixed and Mastered by Antoine Lussier (of Ion Dissonance)

Former titles
The former titles of the album tracks are as follows, as listed on Last.fm:
 "You Have a Body Like an Hourglass, and a Face That Could Stop Time" - "I Didn't Take It Out for Air Baby"
 "The Alphabet Never Made Sense to Me" - "Convictions vs. Addictions"
 "The Jump Off" - "God is an Absentee Landlord"
 "Saints and Sinners" - "Crystal Meth Was Awesome"

References 

2007 debut albums
2008 albums
Liferuiner albums